Odd Future Wolf Gang Kill Them All, better known as Odd Future and often abbreviated as OF or OFWGKTA, is an American alternative hip-hop music collective formed in Los Angeles County, California in 2007. The original members were Tyler, the Creator, Casey Veggies, Hodgy, Left Brain, Matt Martians, Jasper Dolphin, Travis "Taco" Bennett and Syd. Later members included brandUn DeShay, Pyramid Vritra, Earl Sweatshirt, Domo Genesis, Mike G, Frank Ocean and Na-Kel Smith.

Odd Future self-released their debut mixtape, The Odd Future Tape, in 2008, as well as various solo and collaborative projects over the subsequent years. In 2010, they then released their second mixtape, Radical, gaining a significant rise in popularity throughout the early 2010s. Their debut studio album, The OF Tape Vol. 2, was released in 2012. Aside from music, Odd Future had an Adult Swim comedy skit show, Loiter Squad, which ran from 2012 to 2014.

Since 2016, the official status of the group has been highly disputed. While there is no conclusive announcement signifying an official breakup, the group has remained completely inactive, with many of its members suggesting that there are no plans for the collective going forward. Because of this, the group is generally considered to have disbanded. Today, the Odd Future branding is primarily utilized as the namesake of a loosely related clothing brand, which can be purchased online and in retailers like Zumiez.

History

2007–2010: Formation, early releases and rise in popularity 
Odd Future was formed in 2007 in South Central Los Angeles by Tyler, the Creator along with Casey Veggies, Hodgy, Left Brain, the Super 3 (Matt Martians' production trio which included fictional characters Betty Vasolean and Yoshi Jankins Jr.) and Jasper Dolphin. The entirety of the group consisted of rappers, producers, filmmakers, skateboarders, and clothing designers. The group's recording side was known for their rebellious, brutally honest, and profanity dense lyrics.  

In early 2008, Casey Veggies released Customized Greatly, Vol. 1, featuring Tyler on a few tracks. On November 15, 2008, Odd Future released their debut mixtape, The Odd Future Tape.

On July 7, 2009, Hodgy released his debut mixtape, The Dena Tape. On December 25, 2009, Tyler, the Creator released his debut mixtape, Bastard. In 2008, Chicago-based rapper brandUn DeShay and Atlanta-based producer Pyramid Vritra joined the collective; the latter joined Matt Martians' Super 3, and they released The Super D3Shay EP alongside the former before changing their name to the Jet Age of Tomorrow. Earl Sweatshirt, Domo Genesis, Mike G, Frank Ocean and Na-Kel Smith joined the group between 2009 and 2010. Earl Sweatshirt's debut mixtape, Earl, was released on Tumblr in March 2010. MellowHype, a duo composed of Hodgy and Left Brain, released their debut mixtape, YelloWhite, on February 24, 2010, and their debut album, BlackenedWhite was also released in 2010. Domo Genesis released his debut mixtape,  Rolling Papers on August 30, 2010, and Mike G released a mixtape, Ali, in 2010. The collective also released their second mixtape, Radical, near the middle of 2010.

In November 2010, Odd Future completed a two-stop tour and the first was in London on November 5, 2010. The second was in New York City on November 8, 2010. Their concerts have been compared to punk rock shows, with stagediving, moshing, and group members antagonizing the crowd.

2011–2014: Solo releases, The OF Tape Vol. 2 and Loiter Squad 

MellowHype re-released BlackenedWhite through Fat Possum Records on July 12, 2011. Frank Ocean self-released his debut mixtape, Nostalgia, Ultra, on February 16, 2011 . Tyler, the Creator signed a one-album deal with XL Recordings and released his debut album, Goblin, on May 10, 2011. They gained a cult following, and received press attention from blogs and magazines. In April 2011, the group signed a deal with RED Distribution and Sony Music Entertainment to start their own label, Odd Future Records. On August 2, 2011, Odd Future announced the Golf Wang Tour 2011 on their website. The tour included 27 stops, beginning on September 28, 2011 in San Diego, California at the House of Blues.

On September 8, 2011, it was announced that Odd Future would be making a television show called Loiter Squad. The show was announced to be a sketch comedy show featuring various skits and pranks and first aired on Adult Swim in March 2012. The show featured Tyler, Jasper, Taco, Earl and Lionel as main cast members, with other members of Odd Future making cameo appearances. The program was produced by Dickhouse Productions, which is also the production company for the TV series Jackass.

On October 3, 2011, Tyler, the Creator tweeted a link to iTunes with a compilation album of songs from artists within the group such as Domo Genesis, Hodgy Beats, Mike G, the Jet Age of Tomorrow, MellowHype, the Internet, and Tyler himself. The album is simply named 12 Odd Future Songs, despite having 13 tracks, including three new releases from the Internet, Mike G and MellowHype. On March 20, 2012, the collective released their debut studio album, The OF Tape Vol. 2, as a relative sequel to the original mixtape, The Odd Future Tape. On the same day, Earl Sweatshirt, who was absent from Odd Future from June 2010 until February 2012 due to attending boarding school in Samoa, first performed with the group at the Hammerstein Ballroom in New York.

Frank Ocean released his debut studio album, Channel Orange, on July 10, 2012. Other solo releases for the second half of 2012 included Domo Genesis's No Idols with the Alchemist, released on August 1, 2012, and MellowHype's Numbers, released on October 9, 2012. On December 5, 2012 it was announced Frank Ocean was nominated for six awards at the 2013 Grammy Awards, including Best New Artist, Record of the Year for "Thinkin Bout You" and Album of the Year for Channel Orange.

On April 2, 2013, Tyler, the Creator released his completely new second studio album, Wolf, which received positive reviews from critics and debuted at number 3 on the Billboard 200, selling 89,895 copies in the United States. Earl Sweatshirt released his debut studio album. Tyler and Earl also went on an EarlWolf Summer Tour in 2013.

In June 2014, Frank Ocean left Odd Future management, 4 Strikes Management. In May 2014, the third season of Loiter Squad premiered. Earl, Tyler, Jasper, Taco, and L-Boy did an in-depth interview for HuffPost Live. On August 11 and August 12, 2014, Odd Future opened up for Eminem at Wembley Stadium, London..

On September 12, 2014, the Odd Future radio station premiered on Dash Radio, which was released the month before by DJ Skee. The station featured a live playlist, special links such as "Taco Tuesday" (also repeated on Fridays) and coverage of live events, such as the Camp Flog Gnaw Carnival, also hosted by Odd Future.

2015–present: Decline in activity, subsequent hiatus 
On January 18, 2015, Hodgy Beats stated that MellowHype will not release another project, but he and Left Brain will continue to make music together. Hodgy stated in an interview, "Nah, we ain't breaking up. Nah, this ain't no weirdo shit. It's just some real shit. It's a refocus. Going from boys to men this is what it is. So it's either understand it, 'cause it will be explained–cry about it, talk shit, applaud us–we still moving."

In May 2015, Tyler, the Creator hinted on Twitter that Odd Future was supposedly breaking up, saying "although its no more, those 7 letters are forever", seemingly referring to the collective's acronym "OFWGKTA", with Earl Sweatshirt backing up Tyler's claims as well.

"OFWGKTA" was listed on the bill for Tyler, the Creator's 4th Annual Camp Flog Gnaw Carnival. The line-up that performed included Hodgy Beats, Domo Genesis, Mike G and Left Brain. Tyler and Earl were not included in the set due to Tyler already having a solo show and Earl being busy.

Some rumors began to circulate in 2016 about the group working together musically again after a picture was taken of Tyler, Earl, Syd, Jasper, Taco, and Matt Martians together at the Afropunk Festival.

On December 9, 2016, Hodgy released the final Odd Future Records release, his debut studio album Fireplace: TheNotTheOtherSide. On February 6, 2017, it was confirmed MellowHype to be reuniting on Left Brain's solo mixtape MindGone Vol. 1.

Tyler, the Creator's 2017 album, Flower Boy, features vocals by fellow Odd Future members Frank Ocean, Jasper Dolphin, and L-Boy.

With the release of Tyler's 2018 single "Okra", he seems to further hint towards an Odd Future breakup with the lyric "Golf be the set, no more OF". However, later that year on August 8, Taco posted a series videos on his Instagram story, showing an Odd Future surprise concert taking place at The Low End Theory club in Los Angeles. Odd Future members who attended the show included Tyler, Taco, Jasper, Mike G, Earl, and the returning Syd and Hodgy.

In 2018, Pitchfork wrote that Odd Future's legacy was "one that demands we bask in complicated truths, reminding us that nurturing the parts that don't fit is how any culture moves forward."

On October 23, 2019, Mike G confirmed Odd Future was "still together" but that they would no longer be touring.

On February 17, 2020, Tyler confirmed Odd Future was likely not going to release another album, stating he does not think "the styles will mesh much for a good cohesive thing".

Members 
 Tyler, the Creator – vocals, production, music video directing, fashion design 
 Casey Veggies – vocals 
 Hodgy  – vocals, occasional production 
 Left Brain – production, DJ, occasional vocals 
 Jasper Dolphin – occasional vocals, hypeman, fashion design 
 Travis Bennett  – occasional vocals, DJ, fashion design 
 Matt Martians – production 
 Syd  – engineer, vocals, DJ, production 
 brandUn DeShay – vocals 
 Pyramid Vritra – production 
 Domo Genesis – vocals 
 Mike G – vocals, DJ 
 Earl Sweatshirt – vocals 
 Frank Ocean – vocals, occasional production 
 Na-Kel Smith – skater, hypeman, occasional vocals 
 Eddy Tekeli  - Photographer , fashion design 
 Sagan Lockhart – skater, photographer, hypeman 
 Lionel Boyce  – music video director, fashion design, occasional vocals 
 Lucas Vercetti – DJ, fashion design, occasional vocals 
 Julian Berman – photographer 
 Luis Perez  – cinematographer

Sub-groups

 MellowHype 
Hodgy 
Left Brain 
 The Jet Age of Tomorrow 
Matt Martians 
Pyramid Vritra 
 I Smell Panties 
Tyler, the Creator 
Jasper Dolphin 
 The Super D3Shay 
Matt Martians 
Pyramid Vritra 
brandUn DeShay 
 EarlWolf 
Tyler, the Creator 
Earl Sweatshirt 
 TTDD 
Tyler, the Creator 
Travis Bennett 
Jasper Dolphin 
Domo Genesis 
 MellowHigh 
Hodgy 
Domo Genesis 
Left Brain 
 Sweaty Martians  
Earl Sweatshirt 
Matt Martians 
 Trashwang 
Odd Future
Trash Talk
 Hog Slaughta Boyz 
Earl Sweatshirt 
Na-Kel Smith

Controversies
Odd Future was scheduled to appear at the February 2014 Rapture Festival in Auckland, as a supporting act to Eminem. The group was not on the original bill, but was substituting for Kendrick Lamar after the concert had been sold out. A campaign was launched by an anti-violence group to prevent Odd Future performing, based partly on prior occurrences of the group supposedly inciting violence by their fans towards members of the public, and by the group's lyrics allegedly supporting rape and violence towards women. Immigration New Zealand canceled the visa of some group members because of alleged acts of inciting violence.

In 2015, Tyler, the Creator was banned from the United Kingdom for 3–5 years due to the allegedly homophobic and violent content of his lyrics from earlier albums such as Bastard and Goblin.

Tyler's UK ban has since been lifted, concurring with his show in London to promote his fifth studio album,  Igor. However, his show was forcibly cancelled by police after they voiced their safety concerns, saying that it was "overcrowded" and "too rowdy".

Discography

Studio albums

Mixtapes 
 The Odd Future Tape (2008)
 Radical (2010)

Compilations 
 12 Odd Future Songs (2011)

Awards and nominations

References

External links

 
 

 
Tyler, the Creator
Hip hop groups from California
Hip hop collectives
Alternative hip hop groups
Musical groups established in 2007
Musical groups from Los Angeles
LGBT-related controversies in music
Obscenity controversies in music